Crassispira losquemadica is an extinct species of sea snail, a marine gastropod mollusk in the family Pseudomelatomidae, the turrids and allies. Fossils have been found in Pliocene and Miocene strata in the Dominican Republic; age range: 5.332 to 3.6 Ma.

References

 C. J. Maury. 1917. Santo Domingo type sections and fossils. Bulletins of American Paleontology 5(30):1-43
 W. P. Woodring. 1928. Miocene Molluscs from Bowden, Jamaica. Part 2: Gastropods and discussion of results . Contributions to the Geology and Palaeontology of the West Indies

losquemadica
Gastropods described in 1917